Guillaume-André Fauteux,  (20 October 1874 – 10 September 1940) was a Canadian politician.

Born in St-Benoît, Quebec, a Conservative, he was defeated six times (1908, 1921, 1925, 1925 by-election, 1926, and 1930) while attempting to become a Member of Parliament.

From October 1, 1921 to December 28, 1921, he was the Solicitor General of Canada. From August 23, 1926 to September 24, 1926, during Arthur Meighen's short lived second term, he was the Solicitor General of Canada.

In 1933, he was appointed to the Senate representing the senatorial division of De Salaberry, Quebec. He died in office in 1940.

References 
 

1874 births
1940 deaths
Canadian senators from Quebec
Conservative Party of Canada (1867–1942) candidates for the Canadian House of Commons
Conservative Party of Canada (1867–1942) senators
Solicitors General of Canada
Members of the King's Privy Council for Canada
Canadian King's Counsel